Leigh Brockman (born 23 July 1978) is a former Australian rules footballer who played with Geelong and Sydney Swans in the Australian Football League (AFL).

Brockman came to Geelong via the 1996 National Draft, at pick eight, but played just two senior AFL games for the club, as he struggled with injuries. He was rookie listed by Sydney in 2000, then elevated to the senior list in 2002 and made 10 appearances that year. He went to Glenelg after leaving the AFL.

References

External links
 
 

1978 births
Living people
Australian rules footballers from Tasmania
Geelong Football Club players
Sydney Swans players
Tassie Mariners players
Glenelg Football Club players